Prince Regent was launched at Montreal in 1811. She sailed to England and thereafter traded from England with the Mediterranean, but mostly across the Atlantic. She suffered maritime mishaps in 1815, 1817, 1826, and 1827. She finally stranded and was lost, though with no loss of life, in June 1839.

Career
Prince Regent first appeared in Lloyd's Register (LR) in 1812.

On 3 January 1812, Prince Regent, Jones, master, arrived at Sheerness from Quebec.

On 25 January 1815 Prince Regent, Stafford, master, was anchored at Gibraltar when a gale caused her to part her cables and drove her aground. She was carrying a cargo from Malta to Havana. She was soon got off with little damage.

On 13 August 1817, Prince Regent, Bardon, master, was on her way from Havana to Amsterdam when she ran aground on the flats near Eyerland. After 216 boxes of sugar had been offloaded she was refloated and came into the Texel.

On 25 April 1818, Prince Regent, Bardon, master, came Harwich from Amsterdam with the loss of cables and two anchors. She had been blown out of the Texel on the 23rd.  

She received considerable damage to her upperworks and took on eight feet of water in her hold. On 13 December she passed through Cardiff Roads.

On 8 July 1826 as Prince Regent, Masterman, master, was on her way from Bristol to Quebec she lost her mainmast and sails. On 18 July she had to put into Plymouth. While she was there she was found to be very leaky and had to discharge part of her cargo.

In December 1838, Prince Regent, Pures, master, arrived at Newport from Quebec with her foremast sprung and her deck having been swept by the seas.

Fate
In June 1839, Prince Regent, Price, master, was on her way from Newport to New York with a cargo of rod iron, when she came into Tramore Bay. Captain Price was able to get her anchors out before she drove onto the strand. He had intended to go into Waterford to exchange his crew but had mistaken Tramore for the Waterford estuary a few miles to the east. The coastguard was able safely to land all 27 passengers and the 13 or so men of her crew. She grounded, and the initial expectations were that she might be gotten off. Some of her cargo was unloaded. The passengers were emigrants from Wales.

Her entry in Lloyd's Register for 1839 bore the annotation Stranded, and she was not listed again in the volume for 1840.

Citations

References
 

1811 ships
Ships built in Quebec
Maritime incidents in 1815
Maritime incidents in 1817
Maritime incidents in July 1826
Maritime incidents in November 1825
Maritime incidents in June 1839